Scott County is a county in the U.S. state of Minnesota. As of the 2020 census, the population was 150,928. Its county seat is Shakopee. Shakopee is also the largest city in Scott County, the twenty-third-largest city in Minnesota, and the sixteenth-largest Twin Cities suburb. The county was organized in 1853 and named in honor of General Winfield Scott. Scott County is part of the Minneapolis-St. Paul-Bloomington, MN-WI Metropolitan Statistical Area. It is a member of the Metropolitan Council, and shares many of the council's concerns about responsible growth management, advocating for progressive development concepts such as clustering, open-space design, and the preservation of open space and rural/agricultural land.

The Shakopee-Mdewakanton Indian Reservation is entirely within the county and within the cities of Prior Lake and Shakopee. Due to its proximity to major cities, the tribe has earned revenues at its gaming casinos and hotel; it has used funds to reinvest in economic development for the tribe, founding numerous other enterprises. The tribe is also committed to philanthropy, having donated more than $350 million to organizations and causes in Scott County and across the country.

Scott County was one of Minnesota's fastest-growing counties, having increased 55% since 1990. However, according to US Census data released in 2011, Scott County saw the steepest drop in median income of all of Minnesota's populous counties.

The Minnesota River had supported the county's fur trading, lumbering, and farming industries in the 19th century. Today, Scott County experiences a growing mix of commercial, industrial, and housing development, but is still primarily rural. Scott County is home to several historical, scenic, and entertainment destinations including Canterbury Park, The Landing, Elko Speedway, Mystic Lake Casino run by the Shakopee-Mdewakanton Dakota; the Renaissance Festival, and Valleyfair Amusement Park.

History
Scott County was first inhabited by two bands of the Santee Sioux (Dakota) Indians, the Mdewakanton and Wahpeton. Their semi-nomadic life followed a seasonal cycle. They gathered food, hunted, fished, and planted corn. In the summer the Dakota villages were occupied but in the winter the groups separated for hunting. They had many permanent villages along the Minnesota River. They had many trails leading to these settlements and to the Red River Valley in the North, and the Prairie du Chien to the Southeast. These trails were later used by the fur traders and settlers, and were known as the "ox cart trails." The area of Scott County, as well as much of southern Minnesota, was opened for settlement by two treaties signed at Mendota and Traverse des Sioux, in 1851 and 1853. These treaties removed the Dakota Indians to reservations in upper Minnesota.

Scott County was established and organized by an Act passed in the legislature on March 5, 1853. The  county was named after General Winfield Scott. Settlers started entering the area in the mid-1850s. The Minnesota River and the ox cart trails were the primary transportation routes. The first settlers were Yankees, followed by groups of Germans, Irish, Czechs, and Scandinavians. They each brought their own traditions and religions. Most of these settlers became farmers. Fur trading, lumbering, and farming were Minnesota's major industries all throughout the 19th century. With the fast-growing farms, sprang up towns. Shakopee, the County Seat, began in 1851 as a trading post by the Dakota Village of Chief Shakopee (or Shakpay). Other towns were established alongside transportation routes. When the railroads came to Minnesota, they became the primary mode of transportation, and eventually highways were developed along the ox cart trails between the communities.

Due to urban sprawl and suburbanization this rural county is changing dramatically. Cities are continually growing, causing an increase in population from roughly 90,000 in 2000 to 130,000 today, making Scott County Minnesota's fastest-growing county.

Geography

It is the third-smallest county in Minnesota by land area and second-smallest by total area.

The Minnesota River is the county's boundary in both the north and the west. The broad river valley juts through glacial sediment into some of the oldest rock known. Now mostly farmland, it was an oak savanna and a mixture of grass and clusters of trees that grew parallel to the river valley. The savanna bordered the "Big Woods", a "closed-forest savanna" that covered most of Minnesota before it was logged in the mid-19th century. Scott is one of 17 Minnesota savanna counties with more savanna soils than either forest or prairie soils.
One example of native vegetation in Scott County:

Lakes
 Ahlswede Lake: in St. Lawrence Township
 Blue Lake: in Jackson Township
 Browns Lake: in St. Lawrence Township
 Campbell Lake: in Spring Lake Township
 Cedar Lake: western two-thirds is in Helena Township; eastern third is in Cedar Lake Township
 Cedar Lake: there is a smaller Cedar Lake in the eastern part of Cedar Lake Township
 Clark Lake: in Blakely Township
 Cleary Lake: mostly in Credit River; the western part stretches into Spring Lake Township
 Crystal Lake: in Spring Lake Township
 Cynthia Lake: northern two thirds is in Spring Lake Township; the rest is in Cedar Township
 Deans Lake: in Jackson Township
 Fish Lake: in Spring Lake Township
 Fisher Lake: in Jackson Township
 Gifford Lake: in Jackson Township
 Hanrahan Lake: in Jackson Township
 Hickey Lake: eastern two thirds is in Helena Township; western third is in Cedar Lake Township
 Horseshoe Lake: in St. Lawrence Township
 Howard Lake: in Jackson Township
 Kane Lake: in Spring Lake Township
 Lennon Lake: in Cedar Lake Township
 Lower Prior Lake: in the city of Prior Lake
 Markley Lake: eastern half is in Credit River; the western half is in Prior Lake
 McMahon Lake: in Spring Lake Township
 Mud Lake: in Cedar Lake Township
 Murphy Lake: in Credit River
 O'Dowd Lake: western third is in Louisville Township; eastern two thirds is in Jackson Township
 Pike Lake: in Jackson Township
 Pleasant Lake: in Helena Township
 Rice Lake: west half is in Cedar Lake Township; east half is in Dakota County
 Rice Lake: there is another Rice Lake in Jackson Township
 Rice Lake: there is a third Rice Lake in Spring Lake Township
 Schneider Lake: in Louisville Township
 Spring Lake: in Spring Lake Township and Prior Lake
 St. Catherine Lake: in Cedar Lake Township
 Thole Lake: in Louisville Township
 Upper Prior Lake: in Prior Lake

Major highways

  Interstate 35
  U.S. Highway 169
  Minnesota State Highway 13
  Minnesota State Highway 19
  Minnesota State Highway 21
  Minnesota State Highway 25
  Minnesota State Highway 41
  Minnesota State Highway 282
  County Road 42
  County Road 101
 Other County Roads

Adjacent counties
 Hennepin County (north)
 Dakota County (east)
 Rice County (southeast)
 Le Sueur County (southwest)
 Sibley County (west)
 Carver County (northwest)

National protected area
 Minnesota Valley National Wildlife Refuge (part)

Demographics

2020 census

Note: the US Census treats Hispanic/Latino as an ethnic category. This table excludes Latinos from the racial categories and assigns them to a separate category. Hispanics/Latinos can be of any race.

2000 census

As of the 2000 census, the county had 89,498 people, 30,692 households, and 23,970 families. The county's racial makeup was 93.65% White, 0.92% Black or African American, 0.77% Native American, 2.17% Asian, 0.03% Pacific Islander, 1.24% from other races, and 1.21% from two or more races. 2.66% of the population were Hispanic or Latino of any race. 39.6% were of German, 12.6% Norwegian, 8.3% Irish and 5.1% Swedish ancestry.

There were 30,692 households, of which 45.40% had children under the age of 18 living with them, 66.90% were married couples living together, 7.40% had a female householder with no husband present, and 21.90% were non-families. 16.00% of all households were made up of individuals, and 4.50% had someone living alone who was 65 years of age or older. The average household size was 2.89 and the average family size was 3.25.

31.20% of the county's population was under age 18, 6.70% was from age 18 to 24, 37.30% was from age 25 to 44, 18.60% was from age 45 to 64, and 6.20% was age 65 or older. The median age was 33 years. For every 100 females there were 101.90 males. For every 100 females age 18 and over, there were 100.00 males.

The county's median household income was $66,612, and the median family income was $72,212 (these figures had risen to $80,968 and $90,489 respectively as of a 2007 estimate). Males had a median income of $46,593 versus $32,482 for females. The county's per capita income was $26,418. About 2.00% of families and 3.40% of the population were below the poverty line, including 3.40% of those under age 18 and 7.50% of those age 65 or over. However, in 2011, Scott County saw the steepest drop in median income of all the populous counties in Minnesota and household wealth fell by 10 percent.

Communities

Cities
 Belle Plaine
 Credit River
 Elko New Market
 Jordan
 New Prague (partly in Le Sueur County)
 Prior Lake
 Savage
 Shakopee (county seat)

Townships

 Belle Plaine Township
 Blakeley Township
 Cedar Lake Township
 Helena Township
 Jackson Township
 Louisville Township
 New Market Township
 Sand Creek Township
 Spring Lake Township
 St. Lawrence Township

Unincorporated communities

 Blakeley
 Cedar Lake
 Helena
 Lydia
 Marystown
 Mudbaden
 Spring Lake
 St. Benedict
 St. Patrick
 Union Hill

Politics

In its early history Scott County was heavily Democratic due to being largely German Catholic and opposed to the pietistic Scandinavian Lutheran Republican Party of that era. It would never vote Republican until Theodore Roosevelt swept every Minnesota county in 1904 but anti-Woodrow Wilson feeling from World War I caused the county to shift overwhelmingly to Warren G. Harding in 1920 before swinging to Robert La Follette, coreligionist Al Smith and fellow “wet” Democrat Franklin D. Roosevelt.

In 1936 the county's isolationism gave a powerful vote to William Lemke’s Union Party, and apart from Harry Truman’s Farm Belt appeal in the 1948 election Scott County would turn Republican until another Catholic nominee, John F. Kennedy, returned it to the Democratic ranks. However, since the “Reagan Revolution”, Scott County has become solidly Republican voting, with no Democrat gaining a majority of the county's vote since Jimmy Carter in 1976, although Carter in 1980 and Bill Clinton in 1992 and 1996 won pluralities.

Although a conservative stronghold in modern times, the suburban voters of Scott County, like those elsewhere, tend to be more liberal on social issues. For example, while Mitt Romney handily won Scott County in 2012, voters also rejected a proposed amendment to the Minnesota constitution that would have banned same-sex marriage.

Federal government
U.S. House
 Angie Craig (D-MN-2)

State government
MN Senate

The Majority of Scott County is in the 55th Senate District. Small portions of the county are in the 20th and 56th Districts.
 Rich Draheim (R-SD-20)
 Eric Pratt (R-SD-55)
 Lindsey Port (DFL-SD-56)

MN House

The Majority of the County take place within the 55A & 55B Districts. Shakopee is in the 55A district and most of the rest of the county is within the 55B District. Small portions of the county are in the 20A & 56A House Districts.
 Brian Pfarr (R-HD-20A)
 Erik Mortensen (R-HD-55A)
 Tony Albright (R-HD-55B)
 Jessica Hanson (DFL-HD-56A)

Scott County is Located in the First Judicial District of Minnesota District Court

County government
Executive
 Attorney's Office: Ron Hocevar
 Sheriff's Office: Luke Hennen

Hennepin County, Dakota County, and Scott County share a joint Medical Examiner

There are also many departments in the county

Legislative: Scott County Board of Commissioners
 Barb Brekke (1) -- Vice Chair
 Tom Wolf (2) -- Chair
 Jody Brennan (3)
 Dave Beer (4)
 Jon Ulrich (5)

Judicial
 Scott County's court system is Scott County District Court.

See also
 National Register of Historic Places listings in Scott County, Minnesota

References

External links
 Scott County government's website

 
Minneapolis–Saint Paul
Minnesota counties
1853 establishments in Minnesota Territory
Populated places established in 1853